Lake City is a borough in Erie County, Pennsylvania, United States. The population was 2,936 at the 2020 census. It is part of the Erie Metropolitan Statistical Area.

Geography
Lake City is located in western Erie County at  (42.017349, -80.346641). It is bordered to the south by the borough of Girard, to the east and west and partially to the north by Girard Township, and partially to the north by Lake Erie.

Elk Creek passes through the westernmost part of the borough, then enters Lake Erie just west of the borough limits.

Lake City is served by two Pennsylvania state routes: Pennsylvania Route 5 running east/west as West Lake Road, and Pennsylvania Route 18 running north/south as Lake Street and Rice Avenue. PA 5 leads northeast  to Avonia and southwest  to Conneaut, Ohio, while PA 18 leads south into Girard. Most streets in Lake City are low density residential avenues. There are no traffic lights in Lake City.

Demographics

As of the census of 2010, there were 2,699 people, 1,025 households, and 788 families residing in the borough. The population density was 1,564.7 people per square mile (603.0/km²). There were 1,076 housing units at an average density of 598.9 per square mile (230.8/km²). The racial makeup of the borough was 99.32% White, 0.14% Asian, 0.14% from other races, and 0.39% from two or more races. Hispanic or Latino of any race were 0.60% of the population.

There were 1,025 households, out of which 40.8% had children under the age of 18 living with them, 57.0% were married couples living together, 15.7% had a female householder with no husband present, and 23.1% were non-families. 18.9% of all households were made up of individuals, and 7.6% had someone living alone who was 65 years of age or older. The average household size was 2.73 and the average family size was 3.12.

In the borough the population was spread out, with 30.0% under the age of 18, 8.0% from 18 to 24, 31.0% from 25 to 44, 20.1% from 45 to 64, and 10.9% who were 65 years of age or older. The median age was 35 years. For every 100 females there were 92.4 males. For every 100 females age 18 and over, there were 86.7 males.

The median income for a household in the borough was $35,481, and the median income for a family was $40,598. Males had a median income of $31,554 versus $21,533 for females. The per capita income for the borough was $15,419. About 9.2% of families and 10.6% of the population were below the poverty line, including 16.1% of those under age 18 and 6.0% of those age 65 or over.

Notable person
 William Frederick "Bones" Ely, 19th century Major League Baseball player

References

External links
Lake City Borough official website
Girard-Lake City Chamber of Commerce

Populated places established in 1863
Boroughs in Erie County, Pennsylvania
1863 establishments in Pennsylvania